Doris Gercke (born 7 February 1937 in Greifswald) is a German writer of crime thrillers.  She also works under the nom de plume Mary-Jo Morell.

Biography
Born to a working-class family, Doris Gercke's family could not afford higher education for her, so she became an administrator at the age of 16.  Married at 20, she had her second child at the age of 22, and gave up working to be a full-time homemaker and mother.  In 1980 Gercke finally fulfilled her dream of studying law, funded by a scholarship.  However, she never practised, and wrote her first novel in 1988.

Gercke identifies with the political left and is connected with pacifism and the struggle against neo-fascism and communism.  She takes part in political marches and demonstrations.  She also participates in the UZ-Pressefesten (loosely, "Media Festivals") of the German Communist Party.

Doris Gercke lives in Hamburg.

Awards
 1991 Martin Beck Award for: Du skrattade, du ska dö.
 2000 Glauser Prize of the Association of German-language thriller authors – For lifetime achievement in the service of German thrillers

Works
 Königin der Insel. Hoffmann und Campe, Hamburg 2015, 
 Beringers Auftrag. Ullstein, München 2003, 
 Milenas Verlangen. Roman. Ullstein, München 2002, 
 Duell auf der Veddel. Ein Krimi-Märchen. Hamburger Abendblatt, Hamburg 2001, 
 Der Tod ist in der Stadt. Roman. Hoffmann und Campe, Hamburg 1998, 
 Für eine Hand voll Dollar. Jugendbuch. Elefanten Press bei Bertelsmann 1998, 
 Eisnester. Gedichte. Hoffmann und Campe, Hamburg 1996, 
 Kein fremder Land. 1993, 
 Versteckt. Ein Kinderkrimi. Espresso/Elef.Press, Berlin 1993, 

Mysteries in the Bella Block series (also filmed):
 Schweigen oder Sterben. Hoffmann und Campe, Hamburg 2007, 
 Georgia. Hoffmann und Campe, Hamburg 2006, 
 Bella Ciao. Ullstein, München 2004, 
 Die schöne Mörderin. Ullstein, Berlin 2001, 
 Die Frau vom Meer. Hoffmann und Campe, Hamburg 2000, 
 Dschingis Khans Tochter. Hoffmann und Campe, Hamburg 1996, 
 Auf Leben und Tod.. Hoffmann & Campe 1995, 
 Ein Fall mit Liebe. Hoffmann und Campe 1994, 
 Kinderkorn. Galgenberg, Hamburg 1991, 
 Die Insel. Galgenberg, Hamburg 1990, 
 Der Krieg, der Tod, die Pest. Galgenberg, Hamburg 1990, 
 Moskau meine Liebe. Galgenberg, Hamburg 1989, 
 Nachsaison. Galgenberg, Hamburg 1989, 
 Weinschröter, du mußt hängen. Galgenberg, Hamburg 1988,

References

External links 
 Portrait and interview
 www.krimilexikon.de
„Hannelore Hoger als „Bella Block“. Am liebsten würde sie die Verbrechen verhindern“, FAZ, 14 January 2006, Nr. 12, S. 45, Interview with Hannelore Hoger and Doris Gercke

1937 births
Living people
People from Greifswald
20th-century German novelists
21st-century German novelists
German women novelists
20th-century pseudonymous writers
21st-century pseudonymous writers
Pseudonymous women writers